Video clips refer to mostly short videos, most of the time called memes, which are usually silly jokes and funny clips, most of the time coming from movies or any entertainment videos such as YouTube. These clips are usually taken out of context and have many gags in them. The term is also used more loosely to mean any video program, including a full program, uploaded onto a website or other medium.

On the Internet 

Video clips are very popular online.  there were millions of video clips available online, with new websites springing up focusing entirely on offering free video clips to users. Many established corporate sites added the ability to clip existing video content on their websites.

While most of this content is non-exclusive and available on competing sites, some companies produce their own videos and do not need to rely on the work of outside companies or amateurs.

While some video clips are taken from established media sources, community and individually produced clips are more common. Some individuals host their created works on vlogs (video blogs) and the use of Internet video clips as they became bigger grew swiftly. Between March and July 2006, YouTube grew from 30 to 100 million views of videos per day. One of the developments during that period were the BBC's iPlayer, which was released for open beta testing in July 2007.

Advertising
Video clips are a common form of advertising. With online entertainment sites delivering high-quality television programming content, free of charge, online video entertainment rose substantially in popularity.

Today, as businesses seek to tighten budgetary allocations, advertising on video sites has become increasingly common and many of those advertisements are longer than 20 seconds. Video clips are also used in advertising by vloggers who promote products. The average ad goes for 15-30 seconds.

Rise of amateurs 
Unlike traditional movies largely dominated by studios, video clips are supplied by non-professionals.  

In 2005, two Chinese students, Huang Yixin and Wei Wei, now dubbed as "Back Dorm Boys", lip-synced to a song by the Backstreet Boys in a video uploaded to some clip websites and quickly became renowned. They appeared on television shows and concerts, and they were also granted a contract by a media company in Beijing, China for lip-syncing.

In May 2006, The Economist reported that 90% of video clips on YouTube came from amateurs, a few of whom were young comedians. It, in effect, also brought up amateur talents. 

An earlier celebrity was David Elsewhere, who was a talent at popping and liquiding. His performance to Kraftwerk's song Expo 2000 at the Kollaboration talent show in 2001 was widely viewed on the Internet, and this subsequently led to him being hired for TV commercials and music videos. Not only did video clips submerge into the world of TV commercials and music videos, but it also became a popular form of entertainment and a hobby for people called "Vloggers" (video blog creators). Many professional video bloggers can be found on the Internet. Additionally, many notable amateur video bloggers also emerged during this time.

Citizen journalism 
Citizen journalism video reporting dates back as early as the development of camcorders, but all videos were screened by the local media outlets of the time. This was until its spread was aided by free upload websites in which censorship was limited to make a vast number of videos available to anyone who wanted to view them. Scenes were rarely broadcast on television, and many first-witnessed scenes have since become publicly available.

In December 2003, videos in Hong Kong showing the bullying in De La Salle School outraged the public and raised a wide concern on school violence that led to the arrest of 11 students, 7 of which were later dismissed in 2020.

Notably, in December 2004, tourist videos of the Indian Ocean earthquake and tsunami offered worldwide audiences the first scenes of the disaster.

Vlog 

From late 2005 to early 2006, a new form of blogging emerged called a vlog. It is a blog that takes video as the primary content, which is often accompanied by supporting text, image, and additional metadata to provide context. Su Li Walker, an analyst with the Yankee Group, said that "like blogs, which have become an extension of traditional media, video blogs will be a supplement to traditional broadcasting." Regular entries are typically presented in reverse chronological order.

Convergence with traditional media 
The potential markets of video clips caught the attention of traditional movie studios. In 2006, the producers of Lucky Number Slevin, a film with Morgan Freeman, Lucy Liu and Bruce Willis, made an 8-minute clip for YouTube. Celebrities in traditional media have proven to confer more popularity in clip culture than most amateur video makers.

The emerging potential for success in web video caught the eye of some top entertainment executives in America, including former Disney executive and current head of the Tornante Company Michael Eisner. Eisner's Vuguru subdivision of Tornante partnered with Canadian media conglomerate Rogers Media on October 26, 2009, securing plans to produce upwards of 30 new web shows a year. Rogers Media would help fund and distribute Vuguru's upcoming productions, thereby solidifying a direct connection between old and new media.

Short-form videos 
Short videos became popular in the 2010s. Snapchat started allowing users to share 10-second videos in 2012. Vine, which was launched in 2013 and restricted videos to a maximum length of six seconds, helped short-form videos achieve mainstream popularity and gave rise to a new generation of public figures such as Kurtis Conner, David Dobrik, Danny Gonzalez, Drew Gooden, Liza Koshy, Shawn Mendes, Jake Paul, Logan Paul, and Lele Pons. Instagram responded to Vine's popularity by adding the ability to share 15-second videos in 2013, and has since massively expanded its video functionality with numerous additional features, including Reels.

Following Vine's closure in 2017, most of its notable users began making longer videos on YouTube. After TikTok merged with Musical.ly in 2018, TikTok became the most widely used short-form video app and has since become one of the world's most popular apps of any kind. In 2020, Vine co-founder Dom Hoffman launched Vine's intended successor Byte (later renamed Clash and then Huddles). In 2021, as a response to the ever-increasing competition presented by TikTok, YouTube launched YouTube Shorts to host videos up to a maximum length of 60 seconds. YouTube Shorts collectively earned over 5 trillion views within six months.

See also 
Timeline of online video
List of Internet phenomena
Media clip
Screencast
Video evidence
Video sharing
GIF

References

Further reading 

Jay Dedman, Joshua Paul. Videoblogging, John Wiley & Sons, June 26, 2006. .
Michael Verdi, Ryanne Hodson, Diana Weynand, Shirley Craig. Secrets of Videoblogging, Peachpit Press, April 25, 2006. .
Stephanie Cottrell Bryant. Videoblogging For Dummies, For Dummies, July 12, 2006. .
Lionel Felix, Damien Stolarz. Hands-On Guide to Video Blogging and Podcasting: Emerging Media Tools for Business Communication, Focal Press, April 24, 2006. .
Andreassen, T. B. & Berry, D M. (2006). Conservatives 2.0. Minerva. Norway. Nr 08 2006. pp 92–95
Jennie Boure, "Web Video: Making It Great, Getting Noticed", Peachpit Press, 2009,

External links 

Broadcast engineering
Television terminology
Video